The Chi Rho (☧, English pronunciation ; also known as chrismon) is one of the earliest forms of Christogram, formed by superimposing the first two (capital) letters—chi and rho (ΧΡ)—of the Greek word   (Christos)  in such a way that the vertical stroke of the rho intersects the center of the chi.

The Chi-Rho symbol was used by the Roman Emperor Constantine I (r. 306–337 AD) as part of a military standard (vexillum). Constantine's standard was known as the Labarum. Early symbols similar to the Chi Rho were the Staurogram and the IX monogram.

In pre-Christian times, the Chi-Rho symbol was also used to mark a particularly valuable or relevant passage in the margin of a page, abbreviating chrēston  (good). Some coins of Ptolemy III Euergetes (r. 246–222 BC) were marked with a Chi-Rho.

__toc__

Origin and adoption 
According to Lactantius, a Latin historian of North African origins saved from poverty by the Emperor Constantine the Great (r. 306–337), who made him tutor to his son Crispus,  Constantine had dreamt of being ordered to put a "heavenly divine symbol" on the shields of his soldiers. The description of the actual symbol chosen by Emperor Constantine the next morning, as reported by Lactantius, is not very clear: it closely resembles a Tau-Rho or a staurogram, a similar Christian symbol. That very day Constantine's army fought the forces of Maxentius and won the Battle of the Milvian Bridge (312), outside Rome.

Eusebius of Caesarea (died in 339)  gave two different accounts of the events. In his church history, written shortly after the battle, when Eusebius hadn't yet had contact with Constantine, he doesn't mention any dream or vision, but compares the defeat of Maxentius (drowned in the Tiber) to that of the biblical pharaoh and credits Constantine's victory to divine protection.

In a memoir of the Roman emperor that Eusebius wrote after Constantine's death (On the Life of Constantine, circa 337–339), a miraculous appearance is said to have come in Gaul long before the Battle of the Milvian Bridge. In this later version, the Roman emperor had been pondering the misfortunes that befell commanders who invoked the help of many different gods, and decided to seek divine aid in the forthcoming battle from the One God. At noon, Constantine saw a cross of light imposed over the sun. Attached to it, in Greek characters, was the saying "Ev tούτῳ Νίκα!" (“In this, conquer!”). Not only Constantine, but the whole army saw the miracle. That night, Christ appeared to the Roman emperor in a dream and told him to make a replica of the sign he had seen in the sky, which would be a sure defence in battle.

Eusebius wrote in the Vita that Constantine himself had told him this story "and confirmed it with oaths" late in life "when I was deemed worthy of his acquaintance and company." "Indeed", says Eusebius, "had anyone else told this story, it would not have been easy to accept it."

Eusebius also left a description of the labarum, the military standard which incorporated the Chi-Rho sign, used by Emperor Constantine in his later wars against Licinius.

Later usage

Late antiquity 

An early visual representation of the connection between the Crucifixion of Jesus and his resurrection, seen in the 4th century sarcophagus of Domitilla in Rome, the use of a wreath around the Chi-Rho symbolizes the victory of the Resurrection over death.

After Constantine, the Chi-Rho became part of the official imperial insignia. Archaeologists have uncovered evidence demonstrating that the Chi-Rho was emblazoned on the helmets of some Late Roman soldiers. Coins and medallions minted during Emperor Constantine's reign also bore the Chi-Rho. By the year 350, the Chi-Rho began to be used on Christian sarcophagi and frescoes. The usurper Magnentius appears to have been the first to use the Chi-Rho monogram flanked by Alpha and Omega, on the reverse of some coins minted in 353. In Roman Britannia, a tesselated mosaic pavement was uncovered at Hinton St. Mary, Dorset, in 1963. On stylistic grounds, it is dated to the 4th century; its central roundel represents a beardless male head and bust draped in a pallium in front of the Chi-Rho symbol, flanked by pomegranates, symbols of eternal life. Another Romano-British Chi-Rho, in fresco, was found at the site of a villa at Lullingstone (illustrated). The symbol was also found on Late Roman Christian signet rings in Britain.

In 2020, archaeologists discovered in Vindolanda in northern England a 5th-century chalice covered in religious iconography, including the Chi-Rho.

Insular Gospel books 
In Insular Gospel books, the beginning of Matthew 1:18, at the end of his account of the genealogy of Christ and introducing his account of the life, so representing the moment of the Incarnation of Christ, was usually marked with a heavily decorated page, where the letters of the first word "Christi" are abbreviated and written in Greek as "XPI", and often almost submerged by decoration. Though the letters are written one after the other and the "X" and "P" not combined in a monogram, these are known as Chi-Rho pages. 

Famous examples are in the Book of Kells and Book of Lindisfarne. The "X" was regarded as the crux decussata, a symbol of the cross; this idea is found in the works of Isidore of Seville and other patristic and Early Medieval writers. The Book of Kells has a second Chi-Rho abbreviation on folio 124 in the account of the Crucifixion of Christ, and in some manuscripts the Chi-Rho occurs at the beginning of Matthew rather than mid-text at Matthew 1:18.  In some other works like the Carolingian Godescalc Evangelistary, "XPS" in sequential letters, representing "Christus" is given a prominent place.

In Unicode
The Chi Rho symbol has two Unicode codepoints:
  in the Miscellaneous symbols block and
  in the Coptic block.

Gallery

See also 
 Alpha and Omega
 Chi Rho (disambiguation)
 Christian symbolism
 Christogram
 Ichthys
 Labarum
 Merchant's mark
 Kyrios

References 
Notes

Bibliography

 
 
 
 
 
 
 
 
 

Further reading

External links 
 
 

Greek ligatures
Christian symbols
Roman-era Greek inscriptions
Early Christian inscriptions
Christian terminology
Catholic liturgy
Monograms